Seiwa Seisaku Kenkyūkai (lit. Seiwa Political Research Council), also called Seiwakai is a major faction within the Liberal Democratic Party (LDP). It was led by Shinzo Abe from 2021 until his assassination in 2022. Since Abe's death, it has been led by a collective leadership.

Seiwakai is currently the largest faction within the LDP.

Political stance 
Seiwakai is referred to as a nationalist or national-conservative. It has been characterized as right-leaning, hawkish and favoring constitutional revision.

See also 
 Nippon Kaigi

References 

1979 establishments in Japan
Conservatism in Japan
Japanese nationalism
Liberal Democratic Party (Japan)
National conservatism
Political party factions in Japan
Shinzo Abe